The cap and bells is a jester's cap.

Cap and bells may also refer to:

Cap and Bells, a 1913 film by Frank Clewlow
 Cap and Bells II, a thoroughbred filly, the 1901 winner of  Epsom Oaks
Cap and Bells, an 1886 book by Samuel Minturn Peck
The Cap and Bells, an 1819 verse by John Keats
Le Bonnet du fou, a 1918 film by Luigi Pirandello